The first USS Swasey (DD-273) was a  in the United States Navy and transferred to the Royal Navy as HMS Rockingham (G58).

Service history

USS Swasey
Named for Charles Swasey, Swasey was laid down on 27 August 1918 by the Bethlehem Shipbuilding Corporation, Squantum, Massachusetts; launched on 7 May 1919; sponsored by Ms. Mary L. Swasey; and commissioned on 8 August 1919.

Swasey was assigned to the Pacific Fleet and, after completing fitting out and sailing to the west coast, arrived at Pearl Harbor in the fall of 1919. She served there until the summer of 1922, when she returned to San Diego, California.

Swasey was decommissioned at San Diego on 10 June 1922 and assigned to the reserve fleet for the next 17 years. Swasey was reactivated on 18 December 1939 and – after an overhaul and sea trials – transferred to Britain on 26 November 1940 under the Destroyers for Bases Agreement.

Swasey was struck from the Naval Vessel Register on 8 January 1941.

HMS Rockingham
Rockingham was modified for trade convoy escort service by removal of three of the original /50 cals and three of the triple torpedo tube mounts to reduce topside weight for additional depth charge stowage and installation of hedgehog. Rockingham was assigned to Escort Group B-1 of the Mid-Ocean Escort Force for convoys ON 96, SC 105, SC 119, ON 171, HX 230 and HX 236 during the winter of 1942–43.

Rockingham sank on 27 September 1944 while under tow after striking a mine.

Notes

References

External links
http://www.navsource.org/archives/05/273.htm

 

Clemson-class destroyers
Ships built in Quincy, Massachusetts
1919 ships
Ships transferred from the United States Navy to the Royal Navy
Town-class destroyers of the Royal Navy
Town-class destroyers converted from Clemson-class destroyers
World War II destroyers of the United Kingdom
Ships sunk by mines
World War II shipwrecks in the Atlantic Ocean
Maritime incidents in September 1944